Krishna Das Shrestha is a Nepalese politician who broke away from the Bagmati District Committee - which functioned semi-autonomously - of the Communist Party of Nepal in 1969 to found the Communist Party of Nepal (Marxist–Leninist–Maoist) in 1981. Shrestha was the party president.

References

Year of birth missing (living people)
Living people
Communist Party of Nepal (Marxist–Leninist–Maoist) politicians
Place of birth missing (living people)